Keith A. Smith (November 11, 1928 – September 7, 2012) was a lieutenant general in the United States Marine Corps who served as Deputy Commandant for Aviation for the Marine Corps from 1 September 1984	to 29 April 1988. He was commissioned in 1952 and retired in 1988.

Early life and career
Keith Alfred Smith was born on November 11, 1928, in Cheney, Washington to Thomas Clifford Smith and Julia Teresa Smith. His family were dairy farmers in Spokane County, Washington. He attended Cheney High School and Washington State University where he graduated in 1952 with a B.S. in agriculture. On May 12, 1951, he enlisted in the Marine Corps Reserve and was commissioned a second lieutenant on June 6, 1952. After completing the Basic School in Quantico, Virginia, Smith entered flight school at the Naval Air Station Pensacola, FL and was designated a Naval Aviator on May 12, 1954.

Personal life
Smith married Shirley Lee of Hoquiam, Washington in 1952. They had nine children, six boys and three girls. Their oldest son, Marine Captain Vincent Lee Smith, was killed in the terrorist attack of Marine barracks in Beirut, Lebanon on October 23, 1983. General Smith died on Friday, September 7, 2012, in Arlington, Virginia. He is buried in Quantico National Cemetery, Quantico, Virginia.

References

1928 births
2012 deaths
United States Marine Corps generals